Hachaliah or Hacaliah was the father of Nehemiah, the author of the Book of Nehemiah, which is a book of the Hebrew Bible, known to Jews as the Tanakh and to Christians as the Old Testament. Hachaliah's name is mentioned at the beginning of the book  and in : the references to Hachaliah distinguish Nehemiah from others with the same name. Little is known about his status: Bowman notes that many attempts have been made to explain the name Hacaliah, "but none is persuasive".

See also
 Hachaliah Bailey

References

Hebrew Bible people
5th-century BCE Jews
Book of Nehemiah